West Point is an island town and suburb of Magnetic Island in the City of Townsville, Queensland, Australia. In the  the suburb of West Point had a population of 32 people.

History 
West Point is the original site of the Magnetic Island Quarantine Station Reserve proclaimed in Queensland Government Gazette in 1886.  The station was moved to Cape Pallarenda on the mainland near Townsville in 1915, creating the Cape Pallarenda Quarantine Station (now heritage-listed).

In the  the suburb of West Point had a population of 32 people.

Education 
There are no schools in West Point. The nearest primary school is in Nelly Bay on the island. The nearest secondary school is Townsville State High School in Railway Estate in the Townsville mainland.

References

External links 

 

Towns in Queensland
Suburbs of Townsville
Magnetic Island